The East Branch Eastern River is a  river in Maine. It is part of the Kennebec River watershed. It rises in the town of Whitefield and flows southwest to its confluence with the West Branch Eastern River at East Pittston to form the Eastern River.

See also
List of rivers of Maine

References

Maine Streamflow Data from the USGS
Maine Watershed Data From Environmental Protection Agency

Tributaries of the Kennebec River
Rivers of Maine
Rivers of Lincoln County, Maine
Rivers of Kennebec County, Maine